Stjärnbåt (lit. Star boat) is a sailboat class designed by Janne Jacobsson and built in about 530 copies.

History
A Janne Jacobsson-design won a design competition for a practise boat hosted by Royal Gothenburg Yacht Club in 1913.

The Stjärnbåt has typical west coast forms and is clinker-built, usually in pine with the top table in oak. The Stjärnbåt is flattened with surface rudder. The boat was a success and the number series stretches, in Sweden, to over 500. From 1930 it was also built in Finland but got a little smaller sail and was called Vingbåt. In Finland, over 100 boats were built. In the British Isles since 1937 there is Loch Long OD which is a Stjärnbåt with some minor modifications. She was designed by James Croll after a visit to Sweden. Still sailing 100 Loch Long OD.

In the 1950s and 1960s, there were often regattas with 50 to 60 boats.

All or almost all of the successful race sailors who started their course in the 30s, 40s, 50s or 60s have sailed the Stjärnbåt. This applies to Pelle Gedda, Pelle Pettersson, John Albrektsson, Peter Norlin, the Sundelin brothers and many others.

When the Stjärnbåt in the 1960s faced competition from plastic and plywood boats, an attempt was made with a more modern and faster rig (Stjärnbåt 66). This was no success and sailing slowed down fairly quickly.

References

1910s sailboat type designs
Sailboat type designs by Swedish designers
Keelboats